A Crime Investigation Department (CID) is a branch of the State Police Services of India responsible for the investigation of crime, based on the Criminal Investigation Departments of British police forces.

Formation and organization 
The first CID was created by the British Government in 1902, based on the recommendations of the Indian Police Commission, chaired by Andrew Fraser. At the entrance of the CID office at Gokhale Marg, Lucknow, there is a portrait of Rai Bahadur Pandit Shambhu Nath, King's Police Medalist (KPM) "Father of Indian CID". In 1929, the CID was split into Special Branch, CID and the Crime Branch (CB-CID).

CID branches 
A CID may have several branches from state to state. These branches include:

 CB-CID
 Anti-Human Trafficking & Missing Persons Cell
 Anti-Narcotics Cell
 Finger Print Bureau
 CID
Anti-Terrorism squad

Crime Branch CID 
CB-CID is a special wing in a CID headed by the Additional Director General of Police (ADGP) and assisted by the Inspector General of Police (IGP). This branch investigates serious crimes including murder, riot, forgery, counterfeiting and cases entrusted to CB-CID by the state government or the High Court.

In Popular Culture 
Based on Mumbai's branch, a television series CID aired on Sony TV with a successful run of 20 years.

See also 
 West Bengal CID
 Law enforcement in India

References 

Law enforcement agencies of India
Criminal investigation